K. Kannan popularly known as Vedham Pudhithu Kannan, is an Indian film/stage director, writer and producer who primarily works in Tamil cinema. At various stages of his career, Kannan had the privilege to be mentored by veteran directors Bharathiraja, S.P.Muthuraman and K. Balachander. Kannan is known for his penchant for embedding social reform messages in his stories, and as of 2016 he had won Kalaimamani, Tamil Nadu State Film Award for Best Dialogue Writer, Mylapore academy award for lifetime achievement among others.

Film career 
Kannan began writing early, from his school years, having won in district level writing competitions. Subamuhurtham, directed by Raghu and produced under the banner of Indralayam paved the way to Kannan's entry into the Tamil film industry. His subsequent theatre drama, Jaathigal Illayadi Pappa was adopted into the film Vedham Pudhithu, directed by Bharathiraaja, for which Kannan penned the story and dialogue. After the success of this film, Kannan became popularly known as Vedham Pudhithu Kannan. Later projects like Siva, Pagalil Pournami (1990), and Kaaval Geetham (1992) established Kannan as a prominent writer in the Tamil film Industry. From then on, he had collaborated in vast story and film-making discussions for various films.

He returned to stage plays with his longtime friend, T.V Varadarajan's troupe, United Visuals and staged 10 plays in the next 7 years. With the growing popularity of TV soap operas in Tamil satellite channels, he switched his concentration to TV. He has penned TV serials like Nimmadhi ungal Choice II & III, Jannal (Marabu Kavithaigal) and Sahaana. He wrote the script for Anni (directed by Samuthirakani), Akka (Telugu) among others.

In 2006, Kannan became a producer under the banner Ezhuthupattarai, with his directorial debut Amirtham.

Works

Stage dramas 
Kannan wrote and directed these stage dramas:

 Ilavasa Inaippu aka Re(a)el Estate
 Mega Serial 
 Take it Easy
 Iraval thanthavan ketkiran
 Subamuhurtha Pathrikkai
 Solladi Sivashakthi
 Avanudaiya Chellamma
 Magalir Mattum
 LKG Aasai
 Crorepathi
 Matrum Palar
 Veetukku Veedu Kaargil
 Aasikkum Aasthikkum
 Velicham
 Porkaalam
 Suya Tharisanam

Television 

 Nimmadi Ungal Choice II (Kannamavin Kadhai) (directed by S.P.Muthuraman) – Story, Screenplay & Dialogue writer
 Nimmadi Ungal Choice III (Triveni Sangamam) (directed by S.P.Muthuraman) – Screenplay & Dialogue writer
 Akka (telugu) – Story & Dialogue Writer
 Jannal (Marabu Kavithaigal) – Story, Screenplay, Dialogue and Direction (title/credits shared with K. Balachander)
 Plastic Vizhuthugal – Story, Screenplay, Dialogue writer and Direction
 Vidiyal Puthithu – Story, Screenplay, Dialogue writer and Direction
 Sahaana – Dialogue Writer
 Anni – Main story & Dialogue Writer
 Vasantham – Story, Screenplay & Dialogue writer

Films 

 Subha Muhurtham (1983) – Story and Dialogue writer
 Vedham Pudhithu (1987) – Story and Dialogue writer
 Siva (1989) – Dialogue writer
 Kaaval Geetham – Story and Dialogue writer
 Pagalil Pournami – Dialogue writer
 Devaraagam – Tamil dubbed dialogues writer
 Kasthuri Manjal – Dialogue writer
 Amirtham (2006) – Story, Screenplay, Dialogue and Direction
 Puthu Mugam (telefilm) – Story, Screenplay, Dialogue and Direction

References 

Film directors from Chennai
Tamil screenwriters
Indian male screenwriters
Tamil film directors
Film producers from Chennai
Living people
1950 births
20th-century Indian dramatists and playwrights
21st-century Indian dramatists and playwrights
People from Tirunelveli
Screenwriters from Tamil Nadu
20th-century Indian male writers
21st-century Indian male writers